The fourth in the series of color developing agents used in developing color films, commonly known as CD-4, is chemically known as 4-(N-Ethyl-N-2-hydroxyethyl)-2-methylphenylenediamine sulfate.  In color development, after reducing a silver atom in a silver halide crystal, the oxidized developing agent combines with a color coupler to form a color dye molecule.

See Also
 Color Developing Agent 1
 Color Developing Agent 2
 Color Developing Agent 3

References

Photographic chemicals
Anilines